Factfulness: Ten Reasons We're Wrong About the World – and Why Things Are Better Than You Think is a 2018 book by Swedish physician, professor of international health at Karolinska Institute and statistician Hans Rosling with his son Ola Rosling and daughter-in-law Anna Rosling Rönnlund. The book was published posthumously a year after Hans Rosling died from pancreatic cancer. In the book, Rosling suggests that the vast majority of people are wrong about the state of the world. He demonstrates that his test subjects believe the world is poorer, less healthy, and more dangerous than it actually is, attributing this not to random chance but to misinformation.

Rosling recommends thinking about the world as divided into four levels based on income brackets (rather than the prototypical developed/developing framework) and suggests ten instincts that prevent us from seeing real progress in the world.

Bill Gates highlighted the book as one of his suggested five books worth reading for summer 2018, offering to purchase a copy for any 2018 college graduate upon request.

Summary

Four income levels 
Rosling criticizes the notion of dividing the world into the "developed world" and the "developing world" by calling it an outdated view. He shows that today most countries are "developed" and the others are not how developing countries were when the term became popular. Instead, he offers a four category model based on income per person (adjusted for price differences):
Level 1: less than $2 a day
Level 2: $2–$8 a day
Level 3: $8–$32 a day
Level 4: $32+ a day
He says that the majority of the countries in the world are on Level 2 or Level 3. A select few countries are on Level 1 and Level 4.

World getting better

The book also stresses that many people think the world is getting worse when, in fact, it is not. The survey at the beginning states that with over 10,000 poll recipients 80% knew less about the world than "chimps" would have, i.e. they do worse than random guessing. That, the authors claim, shows that the media systematically skew data and trends and select stories to make people think that the world is getting worse.

Rules of thumb

Reception 
Christian Berggren, a Swedish professor of industrial management, has questioned the authors' claims and suggested that Rosling's own thinking shows a bias towards Pollyannaism. Particularly, Berggren criticized the authors for understating the importance of the European migrant crisis, the environmental impacts of the Anthropocene, and continued global population growth. Furthermore, Berggren remarks that "Factfulness includes many graphs of 'bad things in decline' and 'good things on the rise' but not a single graph of problematic phenomena that are on the rise." It "employs a biased selection of variables, avoids analysis of negative trends, and does not discuss any of the serious challenges related to continual population growth." Berggren raises concerns that the simplistic worldview this book offers could have serious consequences.

Bill Gates has cited Factfulness as "one of the best books [he's] ever read." In an interview with Time, Gates states that Factfulness "offers clear, actionable advice for how to overcome our innate biases and see the world more factfully." In particular, Gates found the four income levels framework a "revelation". Of the ten rules of thumb given in the book, Gates worries most about the blame instinct, not for creating scapegoats, but for turning people into heroes.

In June 2018, Bill Gates offered free copies, to all new graduates of U.S. colleges and universities.

See also 
 Gapminder Foundation

References 

2018 non-fiction books
Popular science books
Flatiron Books books
Sceptre (imprint) books